Mehrabad (also Romanized as Mehrābād; also known as Mehrāhād) is a village in Mehrabad Rural District of Rudehen District of Damavand County, Tehran province, Iran. At the 2006 National Census, its population was 1,592 in 417 households. The following census in 2011 counted 1,643 people in 435 households. The latest census in 2016 showed a population of 5,278 people in 1,543 households; it was the largest village in its rural district.

References 

Damavand County

Populated places in Tehran Province

Populated places in Damavand County